Jean-Claude Pressac (3 March 1944 – 23 July 2003) was a French pharmacist by profession, who became a published authority on the Auschwitz concentration camp homicidal gas chambers deployed during the Holocaust in World War II. He was the author of the 1989 book Auschwitz: Technique and operation of the gas chambers among other publications on the subject, which demonstrated the technical possibility of mass killing by gas chambers during the Holocaust, thus debunking many falsehoods promoted by Holocaust deniers.

Pressac was originally a Holocaust denier who, with Robert Faurisson, attempted to disprove what he considered historically inaccurate depictions of the concentration camps as extermination camps. However, upon visiting Auschwitz in 1979 and 1980, Pressac was able to view first-hand the extensive archive of original German documents thanks to the courtesy of the museum staff and administration unaware of the true purpose of his research, and quickly realized that Faurisson and other Holocaust deniers were wrong.

Faurisson case
Prior to his visits at Auschwitz, Pressac, a French national, was instructed by Faurisson on how to go about conducting his onsite examinations in Oświęcim. He was warned against the tendency to see "falsehoods" everywhere. Instead, he was asked to study and photograph the ruins of crematoria in search of "false interpretations" of visible objects. Upon his arrival in Poland, Pressac believed that he was prepared to "revise" the official history of the camps.

Pressac visited Auschwitz Birkenau ten times between 1979 and 1984, according to registered letter from the Auschwitz Museum director Kazimierz Smoleń, sent on 11 September 1985. Pressac used only authentic documents concerning the construction of crematoria and the gas chambers, which originated from the Nazi German office of Zentral Bauleitung der Waffen SS. Museum staff provided him with assistance, convinced of his honourable intentions. Pressac was given access to blueprints which had survived due to being located in the construction office rather than the administrative offices. The analysis of material proof convinced him that his former views shaped by the Faurisson case were in error. He described his experience dramatically in the 'Postface' of Auschwitz: Technique and operation of the gas chambers, saying that he "nearly did away with [himself] one evening in October 1979 in the main camp, the Stammlager, overwhelmed by the evidence and by despair". Pressac wrote:

Holocaust publications
Pressac published his conclusions along with much of the underlying evidence in his 1989 book, Auschwitz: Technique and operation of the gas chambers by Beate Klarsfeld Foundation of New-York with translation from the French by Peter Moss.

In his 1993 Les Crématoires d'Auschwitz, he further delineated the operation of the crematoria at Auschwitz, and their integration into the larger Nazi program to eradicate the Jews of Europe. Pressac estimated that between 631,000 and 711,000 were killed at Auschwitz.

Criticism
Pressac's first 1989 book featuring the totality of his original research was a soft cover limited print already translated from French, sponsored financially by the Klarsfeld Foundation. It was a 564-page oblong 'coffee-table' book resembling a profusely illustrated building construction manual. The broader impact of his research was achieved only with the translated version of his second book titled The machinery of mass murder at Auschwitz : design, construction, use, modifications, and destruction of the crematoria and gas chambers which was published in 1993. Reporting from France for The New York Times, Roger Cohen wrote on 28 October 1993:

The book written by Pressac was a subject of Ron Rosenbaum's interview with Claude Lanzmann in Paris, conducted for his own book Explaining Hitler. Rosenbaum noted how much the 1985 release of Lanzmann's controversial film Shoah "had raised him to the vatic, prophetic heights" from which he hurled criticism at others. Pressac was no exception. Lanzmann said:

Works
 L'Album d'Auschwitz. D'après un album découvert par Lili Meier, survivante du camp de concentration, Le Seuil, 1983 (with Anne Freyer).
 The Struthof Album, The Beate Klarsfeld Foundation, 1985.
 "Étude et réalisation des Krematorien IV et V d'Auschwitz-Birkenau", in L'Allemagne nazie et le génocide juif, Le Seuil, 1985.
 "Les carences et incohérences du Rapport Leuchter", Jour J, la lettre télégraphique juive, December 1988. Read online.
 Auschwitz. Technique and operation of the gas chambers, The Beate Klarsfeld Foundation, 1989. Read online
 "Pour en finir avec les négateurs", L'Histoire, 156, June 1992, pp. 42-51.
 Les crématoires d'Auschwitz. La machinerie du meurtre de masse, Paris, CNRS Éditions, 1993.

References

Bibliography

External links
 The last interview of Jean-Claude Pressac
 Full online version of Auschwitz: Technique and operation of the gas chambers via Internet Archive (incomplete)

1944 births
2003 deaths
Historians of the Holocaust
20th-century French chemists
French pharmacists
Holocaust denial in France
French male writers
20th-century French historians